Royal Air Force Coleby Grange or more simply RAF Coleby Grange was a Royal Air Force satellite station situated alongside the western edge of the A15 on open heathland between the villages of Coleby and Nocton Heath and lying  due south of the county town Lincoln, Lincolnshire, England.

Opened in 1939 and operated as a fighter and night fighter airfield during the Second World War, occupied at various times by UK, US, Canadian and Polish fighter squadrons, the station briefly switched to a training role post-war before being placed on a care and maintenance basis.

Reopened in 1959 as an RAF Bomber Command Intermediate-range ballistic missile (IRBM) launch facility and placed on a high DEFCON 2 launch alert during the Cuban Missile Crisis, the station was finally closed and decommissioned in 1963.  The site has been returned to agricultural use and now has little evidence of its former use, other than several lengths of perimeter track and the original air traffic control tower.

History

Second World War
The station was constructed during late 1938 and opened early in 1939 initially as a relief landing ground (RLG) for the training facility at RAF Cranwell although quite quickly.  In early 1940, two squadrons No. 253 Squadron RAF and No. 264 Squadron RAF took up residence at Coleby Grange.

The station was destined never to be upgraded with concrete or tarmac runways and throughout its operational life used three grass runways.  Aircraft remained parked outdoors on permanent flight readiness and initially only a single Type T1 hangar was constructed for use during aircraft repairs.  Much later one blister type hangar and seven extended over-blister hangars were added.

The station's technical and communal accommodation sites were located on the northern rim of the station with a vehicle access from Heath Road and the headquarters site was on the eastern edge adjacent to the A15 Lincoln to Sleaford road.
 
The B1202 Heath Lane on the southern boundary was closed to traffic and became part of the airfield's perimeter track.  With only a few exceptions the buildings were of the temporary Nissen or Quonset hutting type and the station never developed the air of permanence achieved by many other RAF stations.  The nearby Coleby Hall, built in 1628, was requisitioned by the Air Ministry for the duration of the war and adopted as the station's officers’ mess.  Living accommodation on the station was graded for 1,800 RAF and WAAF personnel including officers.

In May 1941 the station was transferred to No. 12 Group RAF and severed its link with RAF Cranwell. Instead Coleby Grange became a satellite field of nearby RAF Digby and was occupied in turn by No. 402 Squadron RCAF, No. 409 Squadron RCAF, No. 410 Squadron RCAF and No. 307 Polish Night Fighter Squadron

As the tower was within the flying circuit of the new airfield  was removed from the tower's height and its top-piece statue of King George III was removed to Lincoln Castle, where it remains today.

Until 1943 RAF Coleby Grange formed only part of a ring of fighter stations around Lincoln but, when the German daylight offensive wound down, RAF Digby shifted to a non-flying radar calibration role, RAF Kirton in Lindsey re-roled as a training establishment and RAF Hibaldstow closed.  For the remainder of the war Coleby Grange remained as the only local station still operating in the night fighter role across Lincolnshire.

During the D-Day landings RAF Coleby Grange was used as a fighter station by the 425th Fighter Squadron US Army Air Force, flying Northrop P-61 Black Widows and Douglas P70 Havocs in support of the US 9th Armored Division. The squadron was under the command of the US Ninth Air Force from its headquarters at St Vincents, a large mansion in the centre of Grantham.

Post war years
Immediately after the war the RAF mounted an annual series of air displays to commemorate the Battle of Britain.  The first of these displays in Lincolnshire took place in September 1946 at RAF Coleby Grange, as the only remaining fighter station in the county amid all the many bomber stations.

When the war came to a close the control of Coleby Grange was returned to No. 17 Flying Training School at RAF Cranwell and the station became home to No. 1515 Beam Approach Training Flight flying Airspeed Oxfords and  No. 107 Elementary Glider School. No. 1515 BAT Flight left for RAF Spitalgate in 1946 and the glider squadron relocated to RAF Barkston Heath in 1947.

The station was mothballed and placed on a care and maintenance basis from 1947 until 1958 when it was reactivated as an IRBM missile facility.

Cold War

In January 1956 RAF Hemswell just north of Lincoln was established as an RAF Bomber Command missile unit, maintaining and operating nine mobile mounted Thor Intermediate Range Ballistic Nuclear Missile launchers of No 97(Strategic Missile) Squadron RAF.

In 1959 RAF Hemswell became the headquarters for the "No 5 (Lincolnshire) Missile Dispersal Sites" located at RAF Bardney, RAF Caistor, RAF Ludford Magna and RAF Coleby Grange.  The missiles at Coleby Grange were maintained and operated by No. 142 Squadron RAF.

The Cuban Missile Crisis brought the entire UK based Thor missile force to maximum strategic alert and readiness for a ten-day period during October and November 1962.  On 26 October 1962 the NATO alert level was raised to DEFCON 2 and the missiles were made ready for launching, on a phased-hold leaving the missiles eight minutes from launch in the vertical unfuelled condition or two minutes from launch in the fuelled position.  Several Lincoln residents can remember the Coleby Grange missiles standing erect on their mobile launchers and ready to fire.  Politically, the following day came to be referred to as "Black Saturday" and was very tense until a negotiated stand-down by both sides was reached.

The station closes
RAF Coleby Grange was decommissioned and closed in 1963. In 1964 and 1965 the land was sold at auction and returned to agricultural use.  Unfortunately most of the buildings have been demolished with a small number adapted to alternate uses in farm complexes.  The original air operations control tower and part of a Thor blast wall still stand in view of the A15 in derelict conditions.  The control tower is reputed locally to be haunted.

The graves of many airmen that died while serving at the station can be found in the graveyard at nearby Scopwick. In the same graveyard is the final resting place of the poet John Gillespie Magee Jr., author of the classic aviation poem "High Flight".  Magee was flying from nearby RAF Wellingore when his Spitfire collided in mid-air with an Airspeed Oxford from RAF Cranwell.

The long-distance footpath known as the Viking Way passes less than a mile from the Coleby Grange site.

Station timeline and resident units

Gallery

See also
 List of former Royal Air Force stations

References

Citations

Bibliography

Bruce Barrymore Halpenny Action Stations: Wartime Military Airfields of Lincolnshire and the East Midlands v. 2

External links

 RAF Coleby Grange photos
 Coleby Grange at Controltowers.co.uk
 Aerial photograph of the current site

Royal Air Force stations in Lincolnshire
Royal Air Force stations of World War II in the United Kingdom
Military units and formations established in 1939
Military units and formations disestablished in 1963